Warstic (Warstic Wood Bat Co) is a baseball bat and sports apparel company.  It was founded in 2011 by former Philadelphia Phillies 2nd Baseman Ben Jenkins and musician Jack White,. The company is headquartered in Dallas, Texas.

In 2016 Warstic bats were approved for use in the MLB league. Warstic's core products consist of baseball and softball hard and soft goods for hitting.

Sponsorships

Players
  Matt Kemp
  Ian Kinsler
  Brent Rooker
  Justin Upton
  Delino DeShields Jr.

References

External links 
 Official Website
 
 Of Bats and Men: From Louisville Sluggers to Warstic Bats

Baseball equipment
Manufacturing companies based in Dallas